Final results for the water polo tournament at the 1960 Summer Olympics.

Qualification

Medal summary

Results
For the team rosters see: Water polo at the 1960 Summer Olympics – Men's team squads.

Group A

Group B

Group C

Group D

Semi-finals

Group A

Group B

Final round

Final standings

References

Sources
 PDF documents in the LA84 Foundation Digital Library:
 Official Report of the 1960 Olympic Games (download, archive) (pp. 552–555, 617–634)
 Water polo on the Olympedia website
 Water polo at the 1960 Summer Olympics (men's tournament)
 Water polo on the Sports Reference website
 Water polo at the 1960 Summer Games (men's tournament) (archived)

External links

 International Olympic Committee medal database

 
1960 Summer Olympics events

1960 in water polo
1960
1960